Forest and Stream was a magazine featuring hunting, fishing, and other outdoor activities in the United States. The journal was founded in August 1873 by Charles Hallock. At the time of its 1930 cancellation it was the ninth oldest magazine still being issued in the US.

Background
Published in New York City by Hallock in newspaper format measuring 16" x 11", it published many articles by "Nessmuk" (George W. Sears) in the 1880s that helped to popularize canoeing, the Adirondack lakes, self-guided canoe camping tours and ultralight camping. 

An early vehicle for conservationism, Forest and Stream was dedicated to wildlife conservation, helped to launch the National Audubon Society, was an early sponsor the national park movement, and supported the U.S.-Canadian Migratory Bird Treaty Act of 1918. 

Naturalist George Bird Grinnell was editor for 35 years, and contributors included Theodore Roosevelt. Another notable contributor was Theodore Gordon, long considered "the father of American dry fly fishing," who began writing for the magazine in 1903.   

The magazine merged with Field and Stream in 1930.

Notes

External links
 "Nessmuk's" Adirondack Letters
 Google Books Forest and Stream, 1922

1873 establishments in New York (state)
Adirondack Park
Sports magazines published in the United States
Defunct magazines published in the United States
Environmental magazines
Hunting and fishing magazines
Magazines established in 1873
Magazines disestablished in 1930
Magazines published in New York City